The Prince Edward Island Federation of Labour (PEIFL) is the Prince Edward Island provincial trade union federation of the Canadian Labour Congress.

External links
Official website

Canadian Labour Congress
Provincial federations of labour (Canada)